The women's shot put event at the 2013 European Athletics Indoor Championships was held on 2 March 2013 at 13:00 (qualification) and 3 March, 11:10 (final) local time.

Records

Results

Qualification 
Qualification: Qualification Performance 18.00 (Q) or at least 8 best performers advanced to the final.

Final
The final was held at 11:10.

References 

2013 European Athletics Indoor Championships
Shot put at the European Athletics Indoor Championships
2013 in women's athletics